Suits is an American legal drama television series created and written by Aaron Korsh. It premiered on USA Network on June 23, 2011, produced by Universal Content Productions.

Set at a fictional New York City law firm, it follows Mike Ross (Patrick J. Adams), who uses his photographic memory to talk his way into a job as an associate working for successful closer Harvey Specter (Gabriel Macht), despite being a college dropout who never attended law school. Suits focuses on Harvey and Mike winning lawsuits and closing cases, while at the same time hiding Mike's secret. It also features Rick Hoffman as neurotic financial lawyer Louis Litt, Meghan Markle as ambitious paralegal Rachel Zane, Sarah Rafferty as Harvey's legal secretary and confidante Donna Paulsen, and Gina Torres as the firm's managing partner, Jessica Pearson.

On January 30, 2018, the series was renewed for an eighth season although Torres, Adams and Markle all left the show, with Katherine Heigl joining the cast as Samantha Wheeler. Recurring characters Alex Williams (Dulé Hill) and Katrina Bennett (Amanda Schull) were promoted to series regulars. The show was renewed for a 10-episode ninth and final season on January 23, 2019, which premiered on July 17, 2019.

Throughout its run, Suits was nominated for numerous awards, including individual attention for Torres and Adams. Besides two nominations recognizing her role as a supporting actress, Torres was awarded Outstanding Performance in a Television Series at the 2013 NHMC Impact Awards. Adams was nominated for Outstanding Performance by a Male Actor in a Drama Series at the 2012 Screen Actors Guild Awards. The show itself was nominated for two People's Choice Awards. The show's success spawned a short-lived spin-off, Pearson, centered on Jessica Pearson's entry into Chicago politics, which premiered alongside the final season of Suits on July 17, 2019. Suits concluded on September 25, 2019, after nine seasons and 134 episodes.

Series overview

Season 1 (2011)

Expelled student Mike Ross makes a living illegally taking the Law School Admission Test for others. He decided to start doing this to pay for his grandmother's care. In the show's pilot episode, Mike agrees to deliver a case of marijuana for his best friend Trevor, a drug dealer, for a large payout. Mike astutely avoids being arrested in a sting, only to stumble into a job interview with Harvey Specter, called the best closer in the city. Mike's tenacity and knowledge of the law impress Harvey enough to win him the associate position, even though Mike didn't attend Harvard, a usual prerequisite, and lacks credentials to practice law legally. Together they try cases for the firm Pearson Hardman while maintaining the secret that Mike is a fraud. The first season also introduces us to Mike's and Rachel's chemistry. It gives the audience a romantic perspective, creating a parallel storyline throughout the first season.

Season 2 (2012–13)

Jessica Pearson, the managing partner, learns Mike's secret, but other issues take precedence when co-founding partner Daniel Hardman returns to the firm, pressuring Jessica and Harvey. Tensions rise between the Jessica and Harvey duo against Louis Litt as he takes Daniel Hardman's side to be named senior partner. Mike begins to foster a relationship with paralegal Rachel Zane but finds himself pursuing other romantic entanglements after his grandmother's sudden death. Harvey and his secretary Donna face accusations of burying evidence and must discover the truth while keeping incriminating evidence from Hardman, who would use it to leverage a managing partner position. The intensifying threat from Hardman forces Jessica into a merger with a British firm headed by Edward Darby. Mike tells Rachel his secret.

Season 3 (2013–14)

Darby's presence in the firm gives Harvey leverage to seek a position as a named partner. Meanwhile, the merger causes senior partner Louis Litt to clash with his British counterpart. Darby International client Ava Hessington draws Harvey into a lengthy trial against his former mentor, and the lawsuit turns into a murder charge. Realizing that his fraud can't continue forever, Mike leaves newly renamed Pearson Specter to take a position as an investment banker.

Season 4 (2014–15)

Mike's new job puts him and Harvey on opposite sides of a takeover battle, causing the SEC to accuse them of collusion. To satisfy Harvey, Louis goes the distance with Forstman with an illegal route. When Mike is fired, Louis goes to extreme lengths to persuade Mike to return to Pearson Specter rather than work for shady billionaire investor Charles Forstman as working for him might expose Louis' wrong doing. In order to do that, Louis demands Jessica to rehire Mike Ross. When Louis realizes Mike never went to Harvard, he blackmails Jessica into rehiring him with the promotion he desired. Mike proposes to Rachel; Donna leaves Harvey to work for Louis.

Season 5 (2015–16)

Harvey struggles with losing Donna and begins to open up to a therapist about his broken relationship with his mother. Louis' insecurity, however, and desire to undermine Harvey create an opening for Jack Soloff, an ambitious partner who Hardman is manipulating. Rachel's wedding plans and her relationship with her parents are both overshadowed by Mike's secret. Mike and Harvey both resign to protect their future, but Mike is abruptly arrested for fraud. More and more people involved realize the allegations are true, and facing tenacious prosecutor Anita Gibbs, Mike accepts a plea bargain, pleads guilty, and turns himself in so that no one else will go to jail. At the wedding, Mike tells Rachel that he will not marry her now, but if she still wants him in two years, he will marry her after getting out of prison. Harvey escorts him to prison, making their last few goodbyes.

Season 6 (2016–17)

A two-year prison sentence puts Mike at the mercy of Frank Gallo, an inmate with a grudge against Harvey. At Pearson Specter Litt, few employees remain to help. Rachel works an Innocence Project case for her law professor; Jessica assists pro bono but is distracted from matters at the firm and chooses to leave her position to pursue her own life. Mike's cellmate proves pivotal in a deal for Mike's freedom, which he ultimately wins when he secretively catches a murder attempt by Frank on camera. He struggles with his fraud being public knowledge but obtains a job at a legal clinic. Harvey helps both Rachel and Mike pass the bar and persuades Mike to come back to the firm.

Season 7 (2017–18)

Everyone at the firm struggles to adjust to a new normal without Jessica. Donna takes a position as COO, and Harvey's friend Alex joins the team. Harvey begins dating his former therapist, Paula; Louis' sessions with Dr. Lipschitz, his therapist, have mixed results. Rachel begins her career as an attorney, having passed the bar. Mike continues to work pro bono cases at the clinic, with Harvey's blessing, but one of the cases puts Alex, Harvey, and others at risk. Louis and Sheila reconnect, as does Jessica with her family in Chicago. Mike and Rachel accept a job offer in Seattle to run their own firm that takes on class-action suits and get married before leaving. As the season closes, a case that puts Specter Litt in danger is the work of Robert Zane's partners, Ellen Rand and Eric Kaldor. When Zane finds out, he joins forces with Specter Litt.

Season 8 (2018–19)

As Mike and Rachel leave after getting married, Robert Zane is now the managing partner of Zane Specter Litt, with Donna remaining in her COO role. Robert hires a new senior partner, his right hand and fixer Samantha Wheeler. Wheeler later becomes a name partner alongside Alex Williams. Louis learns that Sheila is pregnant. Katrina Bennett makes a senior partner and struggles with romantic feelings for her married personal associate. Donna and Harvey finally admit their feelings for one another as Season 8 ends, but Donna's mishandling of client/boyfriend Thomas Kessler forces Zane to sacrifice his legal career for the good of the firm.

Season 9 (2019) 

With Robert now disbarred, Faye Richardson, a special master from the bar, is sent to oversee the firm due to the perception of the underhanded tactics they have been involved with for years.  Faye is out to dismantle and destroy the firm but has a few skeletons of her own that can be used to take her down. At the end of the season: Louis marries Sheila, Sheila gives birth to their baby, Harvey marries Donna, and they move to be with Mike and Rachel in Seattle. Louis makes Katrina a name partner and remains to lead the firm, now known as Litt Wheeler Williams Bennett.

Cast and characters

 Gabriel Macht as Harvey Reginald Specter: The self-proclaimed "best closer in the city" and Jessica Pearson's right-hand. Harvey has been a name partner since the firm was named "Pearson Darby Specter" but resigns from "Specter Litt Wheeler Williams" in Season 9. He marries Donna Paulsen in the series finale and lives in Seattle with Mike Ross and Rachel Zane.
 Patrick J. Adams as Michael James "Mike" Ross (main seasons 1–7; recurring season 9): Mike was hired by Harvey Specter to be his associate, despite not having a license to practice law. In Season 5, Mike gets caught, and, to protect Jessica Pearson, Harvey, and Louis Litt, he takes a deal to serve two years in prison. In Season 6, Mike takes a deal to get out early and – in the season finale – passes the bar to finally become a legal lawyer. He marries Rachel Zane and moves to Seattle in the Season 7 finale. He returns in Season 9 to help Harvey, Louis, Alex, and Samantha oust Faye Richardson from the firm.
 Rick Hoffman as Louis Marlowe Litt: Louis had a grudge against Harvey Specter, but they later became best friends. He has been a name partner at the firm since it was called Pearson Specter Litt. In Season 4, Louis uses Mike Ross' secret to strong-arm Jessica Pearson (the firm's managing partner) into making him a name partner – thus creating Pearson Specter Litt. He is the current managing partner of "Litt Wheeler Williams Bennett" and loves the firm's members like family. He is married to Sheila Sazs, who gives birth to their daughter, Lucy Litt, in the series finale. He considers the firm's associates his biggest successes, having been their tough-but-thorough mentor.
 Meghan Markle as Rachel Elizabeth Zane (main seasons 1–7): Rachel is the daughter of Robert Zane, one of the best lawyers in the city. Despite getting a job offer at his firm (Rand, Kaldor, Zane), Rachel goes to work as a senior paralegal at Pearson Hardman. She later becomes an associate at Pearson Specter Litt, the first who attended a law school other than Harvard. She marries Mike Ross and moves to Seattle in the Season 7 finale.
 Sarah Rafferty as Donna Roberta Paulsen: Harvey Specter's former secretary and confidante. She goes to work for Louis Litt as his secretary in Season 5 but later returns to Harvey. She is one of the only people alongside Louis, Harvey, Jessica Pearson, Rachel Zane, and Benjamin to stay at Pearson Specter Litt after Mike Ross is caught and sentenced to prison for two years for practising law without a degree. In Season 7, she becomes the COO of PSL. Due to Donna's mishandling of client/boyfriend Thomas Kessler in Season 8, Daniel Hardman puts a case on Zane Specter Litt Wheeler Williams, which results in Robert Zane taking the fall for Donna's mistake and Zane getting disbarred. Harvey and Donna get together by Season 8's end and get married in the series finale.
 Gina Torres as Jessica Lourdes Pearson (main seasons 1–7):  Jessica Pearson co-founded Pearson Hardman with Daniel Hardman. In the Season 1 finale, she found out that Harvey's associate (Mike Ross) was practising law without a degree but could not do anything since Hardman (who left Pearson Hardman years ago) had returned after his wife's death. So, after a long-waged battle in Season 2, Jessica removed Hardman's name off the wall and merged with Edward Darby, creating Pearson Darby. She then promoted Harvey to name partner in Season 3 and removed Edward Darby's name off the wall, creating Pearson Specter. In Season 4, Louis Litt leveraged Mike Ross' fraud into becoming a name partner. In Season 6, Mike was caught and sentenced to two years in prison; however, he was able to save Jessica, Louis, and Harvey from being put in prison. In mid-season 6, Jessica chose to leave PSL and move to Chicago with her lover, Jeff Malone. However, prosecutor Anita Gibbs' attack on Mike forced Jessica to return and proclaim that she was the only one who knew about Mike Ross' fraud – causing her to get disbarred. She appeared in Season 7 on various occasions.
 Amanda Schull as Katrina Amanda Bennett (recurring seasons 2–7; main seasons 8–9): A former fifth-year associate hired by Harvey and later Louis' associate; in the fallout when Louis almost left the firm, she went to work for Robert Zane, Rachel's father, but returned to Specter Litt in season 6 and became a senior partner in season 8.  By the end of the series, she is a named partner of Litt Wheeler Williams Bennett.
 Dulé Hill as Alex Williams (recurring season 7; main seasons 8–9): Harvey's old friend who was a partner at Bratton Gould; Harvey hires him as a senior partner at Specter Litt, and he later becomes a named partner at Zane Specter Litt Wheeler Williams.
 Katherine Heigl as Samantha Wheeler (main seasons 8–9): A talented new partner at Zane Specter Litt, previously known as Robert Zane's "right-hand man," who challenges the status quo and later becomes a named partner at Zane Specter Litt Wheeler Williams, Specter Litt Wheeler Williams and finally Litt Wheeler Williams Bennett.

Production

Development
Suits first appeared on USA Network's development slate under the title A Legal Mind in April 2010. On April 5, 2010, USA announced that it was developing seven new pilots for its 2010–2011 television season, including A Legal Mind, which would later become Suits.  The premiere was written by Aaron Korsh, and David Bartis and Gene Klein served as executive producers.

Creator Aaron Korsh, whose Notes from the Underbelly sitcom was canceled during the 2007–2008 Writers' strike, wrote a spec script intended to be a "half-hour Entourage-type based on my experiences working on Wall Street." He later realized that the project should have hour-long episodes.  Korsh and his agent took the script to several production companies and wanted to give the script to Universal Media Studios.  However, Korsh found it odd that the studio did not want to sell the script to NBC, the studio's network typically worked with.  Korsh's agent convinced USA Network executive Alex Sepiol that although the series was neither a procedural nor what the network typically did, he would like the characters. Sepiol approved the script, and by then, Hypnotic Films & Television signed on to the project.  The team pitched the script to USA network, which bought the script after the pitch. Korsh did not pitch it to anyone else.  When rewriting the script, Korsh made only small changes to the first half-hour, up to when Mike is hired.  Originally, Mike did not take LSATs for others and only pretends to have attended Harvard instead of pretending he attended Harvard and has a law degree. Korsh noted that no degree or test is needed to work on Wall Street and be a mathematical genius, unlike the bar examination in law.  He decided to "embrace" this difference and change the premise.

The pilot episode was filmed in New York City, where the series is set.  The rest of the series is filmed in Toronto (at Downsview Park Studios), where the sets are built to be identical to the New York law offices seen in the pilot. To promote the series debut, USA had an advance screening of the pilot on June 2, 2011, at the Hudson River Park and distributed free Häagen-Dazs Sundaes cones at the viewing.  The network also had a branded ice cream carts, bikes, and scooters give away at the Sundaes and USA/Entertainment Weekly 2011 promotion summer guides on June 22 and 23. They also held the promotion in New York City, Los Angeles, Chicago, San Francisco, and Boston to endorse the pilot.

Casting and marketing
The season was created by Aaron Korsh and was aired on the USA Network in the United States. The season was produced by Hypnotic Films & Television and Universal Cable Productions. The executive producers were Korsh, Doug Liman, and David Bartis. The staff writers were: Korsh with three writing credits; Sean Jablonski, Jon Cowan, Ethan Drogin, and Rick Muirragui with two each; and Erica Lipez with one. The directors throughout the season were Kevin Bray, John Scott, Dennie Gordon, Kate Woods, Terry McDonough, Tim Matheson, Norberto Barba, Felix Alcala, Jennifer Getzinger, and Mike Smith. The first role in which a casting spot was filled was for Patrick J. Adams, who was cast in the lead role of Mike Ross in July 2010. In late July, Gabriel Macht joined the main cast as Harvey Specter. Rick Hoffman came on board in mid-August to portray Harvey's competition, Louis, at the law firm. Meghan Markle and Gina Torres soon joined the cast in late August, who were set to play Rachel Zane and Jessica Pearson respectively. Sarah Rafferty completed the main cast as Donna, and the pilot was filmed in New York City in the fall of 2010.

The series was soon commissioned with a 12-episode order on January 19, 2011. The series began filming in Toronto on April 25, 2011, and completed on August 12, 2011, in New York City. Post production for the series was done at Cherry Beach Sound. "Greenback Boogie" by Ima Robot serves as the theme song of the show and was released as a single on September 18, 2010, and is included on the band's third album, Another Man's Treasure.

A deleted scene leaked onto YouTube shows Victor Garber as Phillip Hardman, originally part of the pilot, but was ultimately cut during script rewrites. It shows that Hardman had retired from the firm on his own accord. Despite being cut for American audiences, the scene was left in for British viewers when it was first aired, and the scene continues to be included in re-runs.

Broadcast and home media
The first season premiered on June 23, 2011, and concluded on September 8, 2011. It ran for 12 episodes, including a 90-minute pilot. The complete first season was available on Region 1 DVD on May 1, 2012, and Region A/B Blu-ray on April 10, 2014.

Suits was renewed for a second season consisting of 16 episodes on August 11, 2011, which premiered on June 14, 2012. The mid-season finale aired on August 23, 2012, with the remaining six episodes returning on January 17, 2013. The complete second season was available on Region 1 DVD on December 2, 2013, and Region A/B Blu-ray on June 26, 2014. On October 12, 2012, the show was renewed for a third season of 16 episodes. Season 3 premiered on July 16, 2013, with the final six episodes airing after March 6, 2014. The complete third season was available on December 22, 2014, on Region 1 DVD and was released on Region A/B Blu-ray on September 1, 2014. A fourth season of 16 episodes was announced on October 24, 2013. Season 4 premiered on June 11, 2014, with the mid-season finale on August 6, 2014. The complete fourth season was available on June 8, 2015, on Region 1 DVD and was released on Region A/B Blu-ray on June 8, 2015. On August 11, 2014, USA Network announced a fifth season of 16 episodes, which premiered on June 24, 2015. The complete fifth season was available on May 31, 2016, Region 1 DVD and was released on Region A/B Blu-ray on June 6, 2016. The complete sixth season was available on Region 1 DVD on May 30, 2017, and was released on Region A/B Blu-ray on May 29, 2017.

On July 1, 2015, Suits was renewed for a sixth season consisting of 16 episodes and premiered on July 13, 2016. The series is available through streaming services on Amazon Video, iTunes,  Vudu, and Xfinity. In the United Kingdom and Ireland, the first six seasons of Suits were broadcast on Dave, but the channel chose to drop the series before Season 7, causing Netflix to pick up the UK rights, streaming the programme less than 24 hours after its U.S. broadcast. Netflix did not pick up the rights for Ireland. The series has not been released on Blu-ray in the United States or in Canada, but Region A/B releases are readily available in the United Kingdom, Germany, Italy and Spain.

Reception

Critical reception
On Metacritic, the show has a weighted average score of 65 out of 100, based on reviews from 29 critics, indicating "generally favorable reviews"  On Rotten Tomatoes, the series holds a 91% approval rating with the Season 3 consensus reading, "Though it's occasionally overly wordy, Suits stimulates with drama derived from the strength of its well-developed characters' relationships." Carrie Raisler of The A.V. Club said, "Suits has more internal forward momentum than [al]most anything else on television right now, and when it's on, like it mostly is here, it just cooks." Julie Hinds of The Detroit Free Press said, "The combination of Gabriel Macht as slick attorney Harvey Specter and Patrick J. Adams as unlicensed legal genius Mike Ross has been a winning one."

Ratings

Awards and nominations

Spin-off

In February 2017, USA began early talks for a potential Jessica Pearson spin-off. Gina Torres would star in and produce the spin-off. In August 2017, it was revealed that the season 7 finale of Suits would serve as a backdoor pilot to the potential Jessica Pearson spin-off series. On March 8, 2018, it was announced the Jessica Pearson spin-off was picked up to series. On January 17, 2019, it was announced the spin-off would be called Pearson, titled after the main star's character. On May 1, 2019, it was announced that the series would premiere on July 17, 2019. In October 2019, the series was canceled after one season.

Remakes

Jang Dong-gun and Park Hyung-sik star in a Korean remake of the series, which is produced by Monster Union and EnterMedia Pictures and was broadcast on KBS2 in 2018.

Yūji Oda and Yuto Nakajima play leading roles in a Japanese remake broadcast by Fuji Television in 2018.

An Arabic version (Suits  (ar)), starring Asser Yassin and Saba Mubarak, was filmed in Egypt, and aired during Ramadan in 2022.

Notes

References

External links

 
 

 
2010s American workplace drama television series
2010s American legal television series
American legal drama television series
Television franchises
2011 American television series debuts
2019 American television series endings
English-language television shows
Television series by Universal Content Productions
Television shows filmed in Toronto
Television shows featuring audio description
Television shows filmed in New York City
Television shows set in New York City
USA Network original programming